Malcolm Thomas may refer to:
Malcolm Thomas (basketball, born 1988), American professional basketball player
Malcolm Thomas (basketball, born 1963), American college basketball player
Malcolm Thomas (rugby union player) (1929–2012), Welsh rugby player
Malcolm Thomas or Mike Thomas (running back) (born 1953), American football player
Malcolm James Thomas or Malcolm Vaughn (1929–2010), Welsh singer and actor

See also